Piñero is a 2001 American biopic about the troubled life of Nuyorican poet and playwright Miguel Piñero, starring Benjamin Bratt as the title character. It was written and directed by the Cuban filmmaker, Leon Ichaso, premiered at the Montreal World Film Festival on August 31, 2001, and then received a limited theatrical release in the United States on December 13, 2001.

Cast
Benjamin Bratt as Miguel Piñero
Talisa Soto as Sugar
Giancarlo Esposito as Miguel Algarin
Rita Moreno as Miguel's mother
Michael Irby as Reinaldo Povod
Mandy Patinkin as Joseph Papp
Griffin Dunne as Agent
Ray Santiago as Willie
O.L. Duke as Paul
Fisher Stevens as Public Theater Cashier
Tara Wilson as Tito's girlfriend
Nelson Vasquez as Tito Goya

References

External links

2001 films
2001 biographical drama films
American biographical drama films
Films set in the 1970s
Films about drugs
2001 drama films
Biographical films about writers
Films directed by Leon Ichaso
2000s English-language films
2000s American films